The Saunders family was a family of important industrialists and politicians in New England.

Daniel Saunders Sr.

Daniel Saunders Sr. (June 20, 1796 – October 8, 1872) was born in Salem, New Hampshire.  His youth was spent in both Salem and Canada.  He entered the textile industry as a teen-aged apprentice.  After a stint as foreman at the Abbott Mills in Andover, Massachusetts, he became connected with North Andover Mills.  Then Saunders built his own small mill in Andover, and in 1840 he purchased mills in Concord, New Hampshire.  In 1843 he sold the New Hampshire mills and the one in Andover in preparation for an even bigger enterprise.  Daniel Saunders' new textile mill near Andover was the foundation for the new city of Lawrence, Massachusetts.  Daniel Sr. was also rumored to have been involved in the Underground Railroad.  The Daniel Saunders Elementary School is named after him.

Daniel Saunders Jr.
Daniel Saunders Jr. was a son of Daniel Saunders Sr.  He married a Mary Livermore (not Mary Livermore), granddaughter of Samuel Livermore.  Daniel Jr. was a lawyer and the 6th mayor of Lawrence, from 1860 to 1861, as a Democrat.

Caleb Saunders
Caleb Saunders was a son of Daniel Saunders Sr.  He was the 19th mayor of Lawrence in 1877, as a Democrat.

Charles W. Saunders
Charles Wesley Saunders (d. 1891) was a son of Daniel Saunders Sr. and the son-in-law of Nicholas Gaubert Norcross.

Charles G. Saunders
Charles Gurley Saunders (ca. 1848–1918) was the son of Daniel Saunders Jr.

Edith Saunders
Edith Saunders was one of three daughters of Daniel Saunders Jr.  She was the last surviving member of this influential family.

Grafton County Lumber Company
Daniel Jr. and Charles W. founded the Grafton County Lumber Company in 1874.  While the company office and sales department was in Boston, the logging operations centered about Livermore, New Hampshire and included the Sawyer River Railroad and a large sawmill.  Indeed, every building in Livermore belonged to the Saunders, along with 30,000 acres of timberland.  Daniel gave up his share in the company in 1880 to his son Charles G.  After the death of Charles G. Saunders, the inheritance passed to his three sisters.  Logging and sawmill operations continued until 1928, and the mostly-logged out land was sold to the U.S. Forest Service in 1935.

References

Political families of the United States
Business families of the United States